The Régiment de Languedoc  was a French Army regiment active in the 18th century.  It is principally known for its role in the Seven Years' War, when it served in the North American theatre.

History
The regiment arrived in Quebec City June 19, 1755. These soldiers left immediately for Fort Saint Frédéric, and on the orders of Dieskau, push back the British troops to Lake George. After the battle, the regiment was sent to Fort Carillon, then under construction.  The regiment was then sent towards the south and participated in the Siege of Fort William Henry. On July 8, 1758, the second battalion participated at the Battle of Carillon. In May 1759, they went to Quebec City where they participated in the defense of the city.  They took part at the battles of Montmorency, Plains of Abraham, and Sainte-Foy.

See also
 Languedoc
 New France
 Battle of Carillon
 Military of New France
 French ship Languedoc (1766)

References

Military units and formations established in the 1670s
Military units and formations disestablished in 1791
Military units and formations of France in the French and Indian War
Line infantry regiments of the Ancien Régime